Oleg Olegovich Kostin (born 6 May 1992) is a Russian swimmer. He competed in the men's 50 metre butterfly event at the 2017 World Aquatics Championships. At the 2018 European Championships in Glasgow, he won a bronze in the 50 metre butterfly, setting a Russian 50 metre butterfly record of 22.97 seconds.

References

External links
 

1992 births
Living people
Russian male swimmers
Place of birth missing (living people)
Russian male freestyle swimmers
Russian male butterfly swimmers
Russian male breaststroke swimmers
European Aquatics Championships medalists in swimming
Universiade medalists in swimming
Universiade gold medalists for Russia
World Aquatics Championships medalists in swimming
Sportspeople from Nizhny Novgorod
Medalists at the 2015 Summer Universiade
20th-century Russian people
21st-century Russian people